The 2014 African Men's Junior Handball Championship was the 20th edition of the tournament, organized by the African Handball Confederation, under the auspices of the International Handball Federation and held in Nairobi, Kenya from March 23 to 29, 2014.

Egypt was the champion and qualified, alongside the two remaining top teams. to the 2015 world championship.

Draw

Preliminary round
Nine teams were drawn into three groups of three, with the top team of each group plus the second best of all the groups qualifying for the semifinal, the remaining two second-placed teams playing for the 5-6 classification whereas the third-placed teams of each group played for the 7-9 classification matches.

All times are local (UTC+3).

Group A

Group B

Group C

Placement round 7–9

Placement round 5–6

Final round

Bracket

Semi finals

Bronze medal game

Final

Final standings

Awards

See also
 2014 African Men's Handball Championship
 2014 African Men's Youth Handball Championship

References

External links

2014 in African handball
African Men's Junior Handball Championship
International handball competitions hosted by Kenya
Junior